Holidaze may refer to:

 Holidaze (Grey's Anatomy), an episode of Grey's Anatomy
 Holidaze (comic book), an American comic book series